Ray Fales (born February 4, 1934) is an American luger. He competed in the men's doubles event at the 1964 Winter Olympics.

References

External links
 

1934 births
Living people
American male lugers
Olympic lugers of the United States
Lugers at the 1964 Winter Olympics
Sportspeople from Boston